Batuan, officially the Municipality of Batuan,  is a 5th class municipality in the province of Masbate, Philippines. According to the 2020 census, it has a population of 14,610 people.

It is located at the southern point of Ticao Island. It is the smallest municipality in Masbate, both in land area and population.

In 1951, the barrios of Batuan, Burgos, Gibraltar, Costa Rica, Panisihan, and Matabao were separated from San Fernando to form the Municipality of Batuan.

The municipality is home to the Bongsanglay Natural Park.

Geography

Barangays 
Batuan is politically subdivided into 14 barangays.
 Burgos
 Cañares
 Camvañez
 Costa Rica
 Danao
 Gibraltar
 Mabuhay
 Matabao
 Nasandig
 Panisihan
 Poblacion
 Rizal
 Royroy
 Sawang

Climate

Demographics

Economy

Archaeological and Ecological Landscape and Seascape of Ticao
The municipality is part of Ticao island, which is known as an archaeological landscape, possessing thousands of pre-colonial artifacts such as the Baybayin-inscribed Rizal Stone, Ticao gold spike teeth, Burial jars of varying designs and sizes, jade beads, human face rock statues, and the Ticao petrographs. Much of the homes in Ticao island use these archaeological finds to design their interiors. The island is also an ecological frontier for the conservation of manta rays. The island also possesses a 'rare subspecies' of Visayan warty pig, that is almost near extinction.

References

External links 
 [ Philippine Standard Geographic Code]
 Philippine Census Information
 Local Governance Performance Management System

Municipalities of Masbate